The Rose Island Concrete Monument is a historic commemorative marker on Rose Island, part of Rose Atoll, a remote island located in the far eastern reaches of the territorial waters of American Samoa. The marker is a concrete structure in the shape of a truncated pyramid with a rectangular cross-section. On the west side of the marker is raised lettering stating "ROSE ISLAND / AMERICAN SAMOA / TRESPASSING PROHIBITED / WARREN J. TERHUNE / JAN 10 1920  GOVERNOR". A brass plaque on the opposite side of the monument conveys a similar message. The monument was placed in 1920 by the order of Naval Governor Warren J. Terhune during a tour he made of all of the islands of the territory of American Samoa, and serves as a continuing reminder of the American claim to the atoll.

The monument was listed on the National Register of Historic Places in 2013.

See also
National Register of Historic Places listings in American Samoa

References

History of American Samoa
Monuments and memorials on the National Register of Historic Places
Buildings and structures on the National Register of Historic Places in American Samoa
Buildings and structures completed in 1920
1920s in American Samoa